Leon Barnard is a South African rugby league footballer who represented South Africa at the 2000 World Cup.

References

Living people
South African rugby league players
South Africa national rugby league team players
Rugby league centres
Year of birth missing (living people)